Nicola Paull (born 1962 Queensland, Australia), is an Australian actress and a registered counsellor. Though predominantly known for her work on television, she has also appeared in films and on stage, as well as performing as a voice-over artist and narrator.

Career

Education and Film
Paull graduated with a Diploma in Arts (Drama) from the Victorian College of the Arts in 1983, aged 21. In 1988, she had a role in the Australian film Boulevard of Broken Dreams while in 2002, she had a small role in the horror film Queen of the Damned.

In mid-life, Paull earned a Master of Business (Human Resource Management) degree from Swinburne University in Melbourne. Separately, she holds a Diploma of Counselling. Paull has  appeared in guest roles on Australian television and film, and on the stage. For several years, she ran a series of workshops entitled "The Business of Being an Artist" based on her Master's thesis.

In 2008, Paull narrated the audiobook "The Independence of Miss Mary Bennet" by Colleen McCullough.

In August 2021, Paull enrolled in the Certificate IV in New Small Business at Holmesglen Institute of TAFE as part of the government funded NEIS program. This program provides individuals on government benefits access to further government assistance to start their own businesses. Paull applied to the program to develop her counselling services business.

Television
Paull made her acting debut in 1984, when she appeared as Doris Cruickshank in the Network Ten drama serial, Prisoner, before rising to prominence with her roles as Sarah Harper in Return to Eden (1986), and as Lisa Mullins, when she returned to Prisoner for its final season (1986). Initially intended to be a regular role on the show, Paull only appeared in six episodes, when she caught pneumonia, and was permanently replaced with Terrie Waddell for the remainder of the show's run. Other appearances include Miss Scarlett in Cluedo (1992), and in the mini-series Darlings of the Gods (1989), Paull played the role of June Kelly. She has also had roles in The Flying Doctors and Neighbours.

In the 1990s, Paull moved to the UK and began working as a producer of corporate events and audio programmes for several years before returning to Australia.

Filmography

FILM

TELEVISION

Publications
Paull has published under the pen name Margot MacCallum with trauma-informed expertise in the niche field of recovery from narcissistic abuse.

 2018 MacCallum, Margot : Healing the Trauma of Psychological Abuse - A Lived Experience Roadmap to a Mindful Recovery (Balboa Press, AU)  | Subject: Family & Relationships › Divorce & Separation (Self-help)

Personal life
On 18 November 2006, Paull married Australian musician Keith Potger in front of six witnesses and a celebrant on the Mornington Peninsula. They divorced on 8 February 2014. Paull is a registered counsellor based in Melbourne, specialising in Acceptance and Commitment Therapy (ACT) and Buddhist Psychology.

References

External links

Living people
Actresses from Queensland
Australian film actresses
Australian soap opera actresses
20th-century Australian actresses
21st-century Australian actresses
1962 births